Gabriel Apetri (born 23 December 1981) is a Romanian professional footballer who plays as a striker for Jiul Petroşani. He played in Liga I for Oțelul Galați and Jiul Petroşani, club where he played the most of his career. Apetri retired in 2016.

In 2018 Apetri returned to his football career and joined Jiul Petroşani.

References

External links 
 
 

1981 births
Living people
People from Petroșani
Romanian footballers
Association football forwards
Liga I players
Liga II players
CSM Jiul Petroșani players
FC U Craiova 1948 players
ASC Oțelul Galați players
CSM Deva players
CS Știința Miroslava players